100% Arabica (1997) is a French comedy movie, directed by , starring Khaled, and Cheb Mami.

Cast
 Khaled
 Cheb Mami

External links 
 

French comedy films
1997 films
1997 comedy films
French independent films
1997 independent films
Films about Islam
1990s French-language films
1990s French films